The 1956 Washington Senators won 59 games, lost 95, and finished in seventh place in the American League. They were managed by Chuck Dressen and played home games at Griffith Stadium.

Offseason 
 November 8, 1955: Mickey Vernon, Bob Porterfield, Johnny Schmitz, and Tom Umphlett were traded by the Senators to the Boston Red Sox for Karl Olson, Dick Brodowski, Tex Clevenger, Neil Chrisley, and Al Curtis (minors).
 February 8, 1956: Mickey McDermott and Bobby Kline were traded by the Senators to the New York Yankees for Lou Berberet, Bob Wiesler, Herb Plews, Dick Tettelbach, and a player to be named later. The Yankees completed the deal by sending Whitey Herzog to the Senators on April 2.

Regular season 
 April 18, 1956: Umpire Ed Rommell was the first umpire to wear glasses in a major league game. The game was played between the Senators and the New York Yankees.

Season standings

Record vs. opponents

Opening Day lineup

Roster

Player stats

Batting

Starters by position 
Note: Pos = Position; G = Games played; AB = At bats; H = Hits; Avg. = Batting average; HR = Home runs; RBI = Runs batted in

Other batters 
Note: G = Games played; AB = At bats; H = Hits; Avg. = Batting average; HR = Home runs; RBI = Runs batted in

Pitching

Starting pitchers 
Note: G = Games pitched; IP = Innings pitched; W = Wins; L = Losses; ERA = Earned run average; SO = Strikeouts

Other pitchers 
Note: G = Games pitched; IP = Innings pitched; W = Wins; L = Losses; ERA = Earned run average; SO = Strikeouts

Relief pitchers 
Note: G = Games pitched; W = Wins; L = Losses; SV = Saves; ERA = Earned run average; SO = Strikeouts

Farm system 

LEAGUE CO-CHAMPIONS: Thibodaux

Notes

References 
1956 Washington Senators at Baseball-Reference
1956 Washington Senators team page at www.baseball-almanac.com

Minnesota Twins seasons
Washington Senators season
1956 in sports in Washington, D.C.